Kim Min-ho (born 11 June 1997) is a South Korean footballer currently playing as a defender for Ansan Greeners.

Club statistics
.

Notes

References

1997 births
Living people
South Korean footballers
South Korea youth international footballers
Association football defenders
K League 1 players
Suwon Samsung Bluewings players